Sweeny Inlet is an ice-filled inlet, 18 nautical miles (33 km) wide, between Spaulding Peninsula and Martin Peninsula on Bakutis Coast, Marie Byrd Land. The feature marks the southeast end of Getz Ice Shelf. Mapped by United States Geological Survey (USGS) from surveys and U.S. Navy aerial photographs, 1959–67. Named by Advisory Committee on Antarctic Names (US-ACAN) after Captain Timothy A. Sweeny, (CE) USA, officer in charge of the aircraft recovery camp at Dome Charlie on U.S. Navy Operation Deepfreeze, 1976. Working at this remote camp in the 1975–76 season, the salvage team succeeded in recovering two LC-130 aircraft which had been damaged at Dome Charlie on January 15, 1975, and November 4, 1975.

Inlets of Antarctica
Bodies of water of Marie Byrd Land